The Nilgiri-class frigates were updated versions of the , designed and built for the Indian Navy by Mazagon Dock Limited in Mumbai. Six ships were built between 1972–81. Vessels of the class formed the 14th Frigate Squadron. The lead ship  was the first major warship to be built in India and was built in collaboration with Yarrow Shipbuilders of the United Kingdom.

The class and its lead ship, INS Nilgiri are named for the Nilgiri Hills. Subsequent ships in the class are also named for hill ranges of India.

When the British refused to provide license production of the radar suite, the Indian Navy teamed up with Signaal of Netherlands to license-build a similar radar search, tracking and fire control suite in India, which went into the latter five ships. Improved versions of the Signaal search radar continues to be fitted in later classes of Indian Navy ships. This re-design was done indigenously by the Indian Navy and gave it much needed experience and confidence in ship-design and modification. They were also fitted with an indigenous ASW fire control action information system which was a first for the Indian electronics industry. This project was led by Captain (later Rear Admiral) Prakash N Gour. The British categorically refused to extend their design warranty to the Indian modifications which nevertheless proved to be a success.

Five ships have been decommissioned and one sunk in an accident. INS Taragiri was the last ship of the class to be decommissioned, on 27 June 2013 in Mumbai, after serving 33 years in the navy.

History
In November 1960, construction of three Leander-class frigates were approved by the government of India. The first frigate was ordered in July 1965 and the next two were ordered in September 1967. Three more frigates were ordered in July 1970. The Nilgiri-class frigates served as the mainstay and workhorse of the Indian Navy during the 1980s and early 1990s. The last two vessels (Taragiri and Vindhyagiri) had more powerful engines than the earlier vessels.

Taragiri had a serious fire in July 1994, but was repaired and was back in active service in 1995. Westinghouse supplied the Indian Navy with ASW sonar systems, two hull mounted arrays and three variable depth sonar arrays which are installed inside towed bodies built by Fathom Ocean Ltd. Transducer elements in both cases are identical.  underwent a refit at Naval Dockyard, Mumbai. The remaining vessels in the series were expected to have their armaments brought into line with later ships.

 was used as a trial ship for the indigenous APSOH (Advanced Panoramic Sonar Hull) sonar.

Ships

References

Bibliography

External links 

 Bharat Rakshak
 Video of INS Dunagiri

Frigate classes

it:Classe Leander (fregata)#Classe Nilgiri